Ibrahima Sory Keita (born 1945), known as Petit Sory, is a Guinean former professional footballer who played as a right winger.

He finished in third place in the 1972 African Footballer of the Year awards compiled by France Football magazine.

On club level he played for Hafia FC in the capital Conakry, with which he won the African Champions' Cup in 1972, 1975, and 1977.

He competed in the 1968 Summer Olympics.

References

External links
 
 Petit Sory profile, Football-the-story

1945 births
Living people
Sportspeople from Conakry
Guinean footballers
Association football wingers
Guinea international footballers
Footballers at the 1968 Summer Olympics
Olympic footballers of Guinea
1970 African Cup of Nations players
1976 African Cup of Nations players
Hafia FC players
Guinean football managers